Samir Azzimani (born 22 October 1977) is a Moroccan French alpine and Nordic skier who competed for Morocco in the 2010 Winter Olympics. and at the 2015 Nordic ski World Championships in Falun, Sweden. He qualified for the 2018 Winter Olympics in Pyeongchang, South Korea for cross-country skiing competition.

He is a Moroccan who grew up in a rough area of Colombes and had eight schoolchildren from Woippy to accompany him to Vancouver so they could experience the Olympics. As Morocco's sole competitor at the games he served as his nation's flag bearer. He ranked 74 in men's giant slalom and 44 in men's slalom competitions in 2010 Winter Olympics.

2018 Winter Olympics
Azzimani qualified to compete for Morocco at the 2018 Winter Olympics in cross-country skiing.

References 

Alpine skiers at the 2010 Winter Olympics
Olympic alpine skiers of Morocco
Cross-country skiers at the 2018 Winter Olympics
Olympic cross-country skiers of Morocco
Moroccan male alpine skiers
Moroccan male cross-country skiers
French male alpine skiers
French sportspeople of Moroccan descent
1977 births
Living people